"I Don't Believe You" is a song by American recording artist Pink. It was released as the sixth single from her fifth studio album, Funhouse.

Background and composition
"I Don't Believe You" is set in common time and played in the key of A-flat major. The guitar and piano are used for the background music, while Pink's voice follows the A♭ —Fm7—Cm—D♭—A♭  chord progression. Pink explained on her website that, lyrically, the song is about pleading for reconciliation, and is her favourite song from Funhouse "because it's just so naked. It's like taking a deep breathe and saying, 'Here I am. Take me. Take your best shot'." She went on to explain that:"The first thing that comes to my mind with I Don't Believe You is me standing in the vocal booth listening... Actually in the control room listening to this song, tears running down my face, just like 'fuck, really?' It's the vulnerable weak side of me that I don't let out very often. And it's [sighs], yeah it's that song. And I love it, I love it. I just love it, it's very near and dear to me."

Critical reception
Jonathan Keefe from Slant Magazine praised the song, notably its sparse electric guitar riff and Pink's "phenomenal vocal turn that is both vulnerable and accusatory", while New York Times reporter Jon Caramanica claimed "I Don't Believe You" swells like a classic soul ballad, as Pink pleads for a lover to reconsider walking away. On another side, Christian Hoard of Rolling Stone magazine gave a negative review, claiming the song is a "goopy ballad", which makes the singer sound like "just another big-voiced chart-buster", and that she has shown more personality on previous singles.

Chart performance
"I Don't Believe You" is Pink's single with the lowest peak in the United Kingdom. It failed to reach the top forty due to physical single was cancelled. In the U.S. & Canada, the track has sold around 115,000+ in digital downloads, but failed to chart on the Billboard Hot 100, making I Don't Believe You her only single from Funhouse not to have higher charting. In Australia, the song reached number twenty-three on the sales chart and was the number-one most added track to the radio on its debut week of release. In the Europe, "I Don't Believe You" reached top forty in most countries with its highest peak in Portugal, where the song reached number one.

Music video
The music video for "I Don't Believe You", directed by Sophie Muller, was shot in September 2009 in Los Angeles, California. The music video premiered in October 2009. The video is in black and white, it features Pink in the wedding dress she wore to her actual wedding to Carey Hart in 2006, and a diamond encrusted wedding gown as she searches for her lover, to no avail. Scenes include her lying down in the dress, rollerblading around what appears to be the inside of a church (The Los Angeles Theater), singing to an empty wedding dining room, crying over an empty wedding album and singing to herself in front of the mirror.

Live performances
On September 16, 2009 Pink performed "I Don't Believe You" along with "Funhouse" on Jimmy Kimmel Live! She also performed the song on February 5, 2010 on The Oprah Winfrey Show. The song was also performed on the Funhouse Tour.

Track listing
Australian CD single
"I Don't Believe You" (Album Version) — 4:35
"I Don't Believe You" (Live In Australia Recording) — 4:14

Credits and personnel
Credits adapted from CD single line cover and Tidal.
Personnel

 Pink – songwriting, vocals
 Max Martin – songwriting, production, bass, guitar, record engineering
 Shellback – acoustic guitar, percussion
 Henrik Janson – arranger, conductor
 Ulf Janson – arranger, conductor
 Stockholm Session Strings – strings
 Al Clay – engineering
 John Hanes – engineering
 dag lundquist – engineering
 Chris Galland – assistant engineering
 Doug Tyo – assistant engineering
 Tim Roberts – assistant engineering
 Tommy Anderson – assistant engineering
 Serban Ghenea – mixing
 Tom Coyne – mastering

Management
 Pink – A&R
 Craig Logan – A&R
 Rogen Davies – management

Charts

Weekly charts

Certifications

Release history

References

2009 singles
Music videos directed by Sophie Muller
Pink (singer) songs
Songs written by Pink (singer)
Songs written by Max Martin
Rock ballads
Black-and-white music videos
2008 songs
LaFace Records singles
Sony Music singles
Torch songs
2000s ballads